Xiangyang Subdistrict is a subdistrict in Shihezi, Xinjiang, China. , it has 10 residential communities under its administration.

See also 
 List of township-level divisions of Xinjiang

References 

Township-level divisions of Xinjiang
Shihezi